Shewanella decolorationis is a gram-negative, dye-decolorizing bacterium first isolated from activated sludge of a waste-water treatment plant. It is motile by means of a single polar flagellum. The type strain is S12T (=CCTCC M 203093T =IAM 15094T). Its genome has been sequenced.

References

Further reading
Hong, Yiguo, et al. "Respiration and growth of Shewanella decolorationis S12 with an azo compound as the sole electron acceptor." Applied and Environmental Microbiology 73.1 (2007): 64–72.

External links

LPSN
Type strain of Shewanella decolorationis at BacDive -  the Bacterial Diversity Metadatabase

Alteromonadales
Bacteria described in 2005